The Union of Tramway and Municipal Transport Workers (BCTBAP; , CBPT) was a trade union representing public sector transport workers in Belgium.

The union was founded in 1919 as the National Federation of Tram Personnel.  In 1945, it was a founding constituent of the General Federation of Belgian Labour.  In 1947, it affiliated to the Belgian Union of Transport Workers, but it split away again in the early 1950s.  Its membership peaked at 17,588 in 1953, then fell steadily.  By 1967, it had only 6,309 members, and the following year, it merged into the General Union of Public Services.

Presidents
1944: Arthur Vercruyce
1950: Sylvain Romain

References

Transportation trade unions
Trade unions in Belgium
Trade unions established in 1919
Trade unions disestablished in 1968
1919 establishments in Belgium
1968 disestablishments in Belgium